Penn Athletic Club Rowing Association (commonly known as Penn AC) is an amateur rowing club located at #12 Boathouse Row in the historic Boathouse Row of Philadelphia, Pennsylvania. Penn AC was founded in 1871 as the West Philadelphia Boat Club. Penn AC has been a destination for elite rowers looking to make the US National Team, ever since John B. Kelly Sr. joined Penn AC after a schism with his former club, Vesper.

Prominent members
Ted Nash, 2008 US Olympic Team Coaching Staff
Matt Schnobrich, 2008 US Olympic Team (Bow in Men's Eight) and 2007 US National Team member (Men's Four)
Micah Boyd, 2008 US Olympic Team member (4 Seat in Men's Eight)
Renee Hykel, 2008 US Olympic Team member (Bow in Lightweight Women's Double Sculls)
Dan Beery, 2007 US National Team member (Men's Four with Cox)
Ivan Baldychev, 2007 US National Team member (Men's Lightweight Single Sculls)
Steve Kasprzyk, 2007 US National Team member (Men's Pair with Cox)
Ted Farwell, 2006, 2008 US National Team member (Men's Pair with Cox)
Pat Godfrey, 2007 US National Team member (Men's Pair with Cox)
Dave Florio, 2007 US National Team member (Men's Pair with Cox)
John Riley, 2007 US National Team Coaching Staff
Luke Agnini, 2007 US National Team Coaching Staff
Andrew Medcalf, 2007 US National Team Coaching Staff
Christopher DeFelice 2004 US National Team member (Men's Pair with Cox)
Jeff McLaughlin, 1992 & 1988 US Olympic Teams member
George G. Loveless, 1936 US Olympic Team
Dan Barrow, 1936 US Olympic Team
Charles J. McIlvaine, 1928 US Olympic Team
Paul Costello, 1920, 1924 & 1928 US Olympic Teams member

Photo gallery

See also

Robert Desino
Edward Marsh

References

Further reading

External links

 Penn AC on wikimapia.org

Schuylkill Navy
Sports clubs established in 1871
1871 establishments in Pennsylvania
Philadelphia Register of Historic Places
Clubs and societies in Philadelphia
Historic district contributing properties in Pennsylvania